Skylanders: Spyro's Adventure is the first video game in the Skylanders series. It is a 3D action-adventure platform game that is played along with toy figures that interact with it through a "Portal of Power" that reads their tag through NFC and features the voices of Josh Keaton, Darin De Paul, Dave Wittenberg, Keythe Farley, Audrey Wasilewski, Joey Camen and Kevin Michael Richardson.

It was released in October 2011 for North America, Europe, and Australia for Microsoft Windows and OS X, Nintendo 3DS, PlayStation 3, Wii and Xbox 360. For Japan, it was released on July 12, 2013, where it was published by Square Enix, for the Wii, PlayStation 3, Nintendo 3DS and Wii U.

Activision announced that as of June 3, 2012, the game had been the top-selling console and handheld video game worldwide for 2012. As of March 31, 2012, Activision has sold over 30 million Skylanders toys, and sales were expected to exceed $500 million by the end of the year. A direct sequel, Skylanders: Giants, was released in 2012 for the Nintendo 3DS, PlayStation 3, Xbox 360, Wii and Wii U. It is the only Skylanders in the series to have a Microsoft Windows and OS X release.

3DS version 
This version of Skylanders: Spyro's Adventure is more of an action platformer than its console counterparts. Players have to complete levels by gathering crystals, which let them unlock more levels. Each level is littered with crystals, obtained by going towards the end of the level, or by completing a variety of tasks, such as defeating a certain number of enemies, or finding items. Whenever the player finds a crystal, an enemy awakens and a time limit starts. They have to defeat enemies, and get clocks in the level to get more time to ward off the chasing enemy. Unlike other versions, characters can make a jump, and a double jump. This version of the game is set in a different realm in Skylands called the Radiant Isles, and a different force of darkness is faced under the command of Hektore. Unlike the console versions, the starter pack for the 3DS version comes with the Skylanders Ignitor, Stealth Elf, and Dark Spyro.

Synopsis 
Players take on the role of a Portal Master, who can control over 30 different Skylanders, including the purple dragon, Spyro, by placing their figurines on the Portal of Power. These heroes are the protectors of an amazing, mysterious world, but they have been ejected from their world by the sinister Dark Portal Master known as Kaos, and now, they are frozen and shrunken down on earth as toys. Due to the lack of magic in the human world, the skylanders are petrified, and only the players of Skylanders: Spyro's Adventure can get them back into their world. Once back in their home world, the skylanders embark on a fantastical journey where they will explore mythical lands, battle menacing, outlandish creatures, collect treasures, and solve challenging puzzles as a part of the quest to save their world.

Characters 
There are 32 standard characters and 8 different elements under which characters are classified. The 8 elements are Magic, Water, Tech, Fire, Earth, Life, Air, and Undead, with four Skylanders for each element. When the character figurines are placed on the "Portal of Power" peripheral, they appear in the game. The "Starter Pack" has three characters to start with – Spyro, Trigger Happy, and Gill Grunt. Each character has specialized statistics in areas such as health and speed. The player can also find hats for the characters, which further affect statistics. Special Elemental Gates require a Skylander with the corresponding element to pass through. With two players, only one player needs to be controlling a Skylander of the correct element.

In addition to the standard character figures that are available for purchase, there are also limited edition Gold, Silver, Crystal, Chrome, and Glow-in-the-Dark versions of certain characters.

Plot 
The game begins with a village in Skylands being ravaged by a massive tornado. A small, bookish fellow named Hugo mentions the destruction of the "Core of Light" and an individual called "Master Eon". A Skylander is sent down to the village by the player and proceeds to save the villagers.

Following the rescue, the player is introduced to the Ruins and some of the game's backstory is explained. The Portal Masters and the Skylanders had protected Skylands from "The Darkness" for as long as anyone could remember. Master Eon, the last good Portal Master in Skylands, and his Skylanders guarded the Core of Light, a great machine that enriched the world and repelling The Darkness, the ultimate force behind all evil. However, Kaos, a Dark Portal Master who attempted to destroy the Core of Light in the past, returned from his banishment in the Outlands to destroy the Core to rule Skylands as its emperor, knowing that Eon has grown weaker with age. The Skylanders fought against Kaos' minions to protect the Core of Light. Just as they were winning the battle, Kaos initiates "Plan Z" by unleashing a mysterious creature that successfully destroyed the Core, allowing The Darkness to take over and causing the Skylanders to be banished from their world. As the Skylanders were drifted farther away from the magic of Skylands, they began to shrink until they reached Earth, where they were turned into toys as a result of that world bearing no magic. Master Eon did survive the destruction of the Core of Light, but in doing so became a spirit without a physical body which means he couldn't fight Kaos and the Darkness. He and the Skylanders then awaited for the arrival of a new Portal Master until one finally arrived: the young player, who finds the Skylanders.

To restore the Core of Light, however, the player must collect several mystical objects. They must bring back The Eternal Source of each of the eight elements, and for every source there is also an artifact which must also be recovered. This is no small task, as Kaos is quick to notice and sends all of his minions out to destroy the new Portal Master and the Skylanders. Despite his best efforts (among them creating dark copies of Skylanders), Kaos fails to stop the player and the Core of Light is restored. Humiliated and weakened, Kaos and his assistant Glumshanks retreat to the Outlands, Skylands' most desolate area. Not wanting to leave anything to chance, the player and the Skylanders journey to Kaos' Fortress, where they engage in a massive battle against the Dark Portal Master, his dark Skylanders and the Hydra, the beast responsible for the Core of Light's destruction and Master Eon's transformation to a spirit.

In the end, Kaos is defeated. While he is unconcerned about being banished again, Eon informs him that he is being banished not to the Outlands, but to Earth. Hugo gladly sends Kaos to Earth, where he becomes a petrified figure similar to the trapped skylanders.

Development 
Toys for Bob was given the opportunity to revive a Vivendi franchise, and they chose the Spyro the Dragon franchise. Paul Reiche III noted: "attempts to revive broad-audience mascot franchises haven't seen predictable success in the game industry. Just creating a new Spyro game after the traditional fashion was unlikely to work" and reinventing the character as a "really gritty, strange otherworldly Spyro" didn't seem like a promising idea. Reiche says he had considered integrating technology with toys and games for a while, and it was the kind of concept that was so outlandish that it was the most promising idea the team sketched out for the brand.

The game's original working title was Spyro's Kingdom from June 2009. The game was originally going to be a mature Spyro game with a much darker tone, that also included blood, but the developers of Toys for Bob lost their enthusiasm and felt that this direction did not feel like "Spyro". They spent six months on a variety of different directions with Spyro, and with the time and budget given by Activision.

Executive producer Jeff Poffenbarger stated that the game is geared more towards younger gamers who have no prior knowledge of the Spyro character.

To enable the game to work with the toys, the base of each toy contains an RFID chip which communicates wirelessly with the portal when in near proximity to inform the game which toy is currently active. The RFID chip also retains several key stats including gold, level and upgrades purchased and won through gameplay. Due to the use of RFID, the toys are portable between supported platforms while retaining their stats, allowing players to use their characters in other player's copy of the game with all upgrades in place. Additionally, two figures can be placed on the portal simultaneously, for cooperative or versus play.

The game's original score was written primarily by Lorne Balfe, with some additional compositions by Andrew Kawczynski and Pete Adams. The main theme was written by Hans Zimmer.

The game's main story was penned by Alec Sokolow and Joel Cohen, both of whom worked on Pixar's original Toy Story film. The game was originally revealed to be exclusive for the Wii, and was intended to be released in 2010. However, the game would get delayed, allowing the developers to add features such as saving data to the toys, more polished content and story, and ports to additional platforms. Due to this, the Xbox 360, PlayStation 3, MacOS, and Windows ports run on different engines than the Wii version.

According to the Sterne Agee analyst Arvind Bathia, Skylanders: Spyro's Adventure "is testing apparently very well with kids", who are the game's target audience.

Nickelodeon of Europe and Activision had worked together to help sponsor a tour called Skylanders: Spyro's Adventure Live to help promote the game, ranging from September 10–11 at Liverpool, Williamson Square to September 17–18 at London, Westfield Stratford.

Japan eventually finally saw a release of this game, being handled by Toys "R" Us and Square Enix and was released for the Wii, PlayStation 3, Nintendo 3DS and the region has also received a unique Wii U port exclusively (instead of having an Xbox 360 release), being released on July 12, 2013, which was nearly two years after its release in the western regions, thus making this the first Spyro game to be released in Japan in almost 10 years, since Spyro Orange: The Cortex Conspiracy.

Reception 

Skylanders: Spyro's Adventure received "generally favorable" reviews according to review aggregator Metacritic.

GameSpot gave it a 7.5 out of 10, praising its family-friendly gameplay and role-playing-style character progression, but criticized the lack of online multiplayer, the cost of buying a complete set of figures, the arbitrary inclusion of Spyro, and the unreliability of the Portal of Power peripheral. Nintendo World Report gave the game a 9 out of 10, praising the Wii version for its gameplay and production values, and the Nintendo 3DS version for its accessibility to younger gamers and overall design.

Destructoid gave the game an 8 out of 10 saying, "It's not the most complex game on the market, but the innovative gadgetry and authentic thoughtfulness on the part of the developer stands out in a market so used to churning out the same old crap." IGN gave Skylanders an 8 out of 10. Skylanders was nominated for two Toy Industry Association awards: 'Game of the Year' and 'Innovative Toy of the Year'.

Giant Bomb reviewer Jeff Gerstmann gave the game four out of five stars, stating "Skylanders is probably aimed at kids, but whatever. I am a legal adult...and I think it's still pretty cool."

Sales 
During the first quarter of 2012, Skylanders was the third most profitable game in North America and Europe, including sales of accessories and figures. According to Activision's internal estimates, sales of Skylanders toys exceeded those of the number one action figure line at the time, Star Wars.

Over 30,000,000 Skylanders toys have been sold worldwide. Toy sales from the first game were twice to 3 times higher than Activision had originally expected, prompting the making of a sequel.

As of December 2012, the Skylanders franchise sold more than $500 million in retail sales in the U.S., inclusive of accessory packs and figures. In 2012 alone, Skylanders: Giants, the sequel to Skylanders: Spyro's Adventure—the #1 best-selling kids' game of 2011—generated more than $195,000,000 in U.S. sales.

Sequels and other media 
Activision announced a sequel, Skylanders: Giants, which was released in October 2012. A Web game called Skylanders: Universe was created as well but was discontinued on 29 April 2013. A second sequel, Skylanders: Swap Force, was released in October 2013. A third sequel, Skylanders: Trap Team, was released in October 2014. A fourth sequel, Skylanders: SuperChargers was released in September 2015. A fifth sequel, Skylanders: Imaginators was released in October 2016.
 
On May 3, 2012, an illustrated novel titled: Skylanders: The Machine of Doom has been released on eBook applications, that is set as a canon prequel to the first Skylanders game. It was written by Cavan Scott under the pen name, "Onk Beakman". Later novel adaptions under the Skylanders: Mask of Power series were written following a year after the first book's release; they are set after the events of The Machine of Doom and are also prequels to the first Skylanders game. The eighth and final book in the Mask of Power series was released on May 3, 2016.

A comic series created by IDW Publishing is associated with the Skylanders franchise with events that take place in between the games starting with Skylanders: Trap Team.

Activison had commented on the possibility of a Skylanders movie and TV series as something that they could see themselves looking into in the future. While Activision confirmed on May 30, 2013, that there were no plans for a Skylanders movie adaption nor a TV series, on November 6, 2015, they announced the opening of Activision Blizzard Studios, who are in the process of developing Skylanders into a film and television series; the latter being called Skylanders Academy, which was released on Netflix on October 28, 2016.

References

External links 
 
 

2011 video games
3D platform games
Activision games
Cooperative video games
Dinosaurs in video games
MacOS games
Multiplayer and single-player video games
Nintendo 3DS games
PlayStation 3 games
Role-playing video games
Science fantasy video games
Spyro the Dragon video games
Square Enix games
Superhero video games
Toys for Bob games
Toys-to-life games
Vicarious Visions games
Video games developed in Taiwan
Video games scored by Lorne Balfe
Wii games
Wii U games
Windows games
Xbox 360 games
Video games developed in the United States
Spyro's Adventure

de:Spyro#Skylanders: Spyro's Adventure